Viktor Georgiyevich Pugachev (born 8 August 1948 in Taganrog, RSFSR) is a retired Russian Air Force officer and a former Soviet test pilot who was the first to demonstrate the so-called Pugachev's Cobra manoeuvre to the general public in 1989, flying an Su-27. Gold medal of the Hero of the Soviet Union was awarded to him in the late 1980s.  He graduated from Yeysk military aviation school in 1970, test-pilot school in 1978 and the Moscow Aviation Institute in 1980. After two years with Gromov Flight Research Institute he joined OKB Sukhoi where he tested the Su-9, Su-15, Su-24, Su-25 and the Su-27.  On 1 November 1989 he landed an Su-27K on an aircraft carrier for the first time in Soviet history. He became famous after his 1989 Su-27 demonstrations on the Paris Airshow. Pugachev is credited with first ever non-vertical take-off and landing (VTOL) from the aircraft carrier Admiral Kuznetsov.

He currently lives in Zhukovsky and works as the Chief Pilot Designer at Sukhoi Design Bureau.

Record flights
While working as a test pilot at Sukhoi he broke 13 world records in the Sukhoi P-42:

Honours and awards
 Hero of the Soviet Union (1989) – for courage and heroism in the development of the Su-27
 Order of Merit for the Fatherland, 3rd class (1999) – for services to the state, a large contribution to the development, creation of modern aviation technology and years of diligent work
 Order of Lenin (1989)
 Order of the Badge of Honour (1983)
 Order for Personal Courage
 Honoured Test Pilot of the USSR (1991)
 Order of Ivan Kalita (Moscow Region (2008)
 Prize Laureate. Vladimir Vysotsky's "Own Track"
 Jubilee Medal "300 Years of the Russian Navy"
 Medal "In Commemoration of the 850th Anniversary of Moscow"

References

Living people
1948 births
Soviet aviators
Heroes of the Soviet Union
Recipients of the Order "For Merit to the Fatherland", 3rd class
Recipients of the Order of Lenin
Recipients of the Order "For Personal Courage"
Military personnel from Taganrog
Russian aviation record holders
Soviet test pilots
Soviet aviation record holders